Caillaud is a surname. Notable people with the surname include:

Dominique Caillaud (born 1946), French politician
Frédéric Cailliaud (1787–1869), French naturalist, mineralogist and conchologist
John Caillaud (1726–1812), British General who was Commander-in-Chief, India
Michel Caillaud (born 1957), French chess problemist